Pêra Rocha (literally "rock pear",) is a native Portuguese variety of pear. The earliest account of the Rocha variety dates from 1836, in the Sintra municipality. This variety was casually obtained from a seed, on Pedro António Rocha's farm. The variety derives its name from his family name. The 'Rocha' pear is produced in several places in Portugal. The production area is over 100 km² and there are about 9,450 producers.

Pêra Rocha do Oeste DOP
'Rocha' Pear produced in the Oeste region of Portugal has a PDO status since 2003. 
It is the most renowned, being a product with specific characteristics:
 Size: medium 55 mm to 75 mm
 Format: oval, piriform 
 Skin: fine and smooth
 Colour: yellow and green
 Russeting: typical around peduncle
 Pulp Colour: white
 Pulp: hard and firm, crunchy, juicy and sweet
 'Rocha' pear is very sensitive to pear scab (Venturia pyrina) and also to Stemphylium vesicarium.

Over 13,520,000 kg of Oeste’s 'Rocha' Pear was exported in 2004 to countries like Britain, Brazil, France, Ireland, Russia, Poland, the Netherlands, Canada and Spain.

See also
 Agriculture in Portugal
 List of Portugal Fresh fruits with protected status

References

Agriculture in Portugal
Pears
Portuguese products with protected designation of origin